Aggrey Henry Bagiire is a Ugandan politician. He is the State Minister for Transport in the Ugandan Cabinet. He was appointed to that position on 6 June 2016. Also  served as the elected member of parliament representing Bunya County West, Mayuge District, in the 10th Ugandan Parliament (2016–2021).

See also
Cabinet of Uganda
 Parliament of Uganda

References

Living people
Mayuge District
Members of the Parliament of Uganda
Government ministers of Uganda
People from Eastern Region, Uganda
Year of birth missing (living people)
National Resistance Movement politicians
21st-century Ugandan politicians